Elliot Thompson (born 10 August 1992) is the 2022 British champion of decathlon. He is the son of two time Olympic champion decathlete Daley Thompson.

Thompson graduated with a degree in mechatronics and robotics from Leeds University and played rugby union as a back before suffering a serious shoulder injury. Thompson worked as a personal trainer and had been a decathlete for five years before winning the senior British Championship in 2022. Thomson set a new personal best decathlon score of 7204 points in June 2022.

Personal life
Elliot’s brother Alex Clayton plays rugby union for the University of Bath and England Sevens.

References

1992 births
Living people
English decathletes
British decathletes
20th-century British people
21st-century British people